The Epic Tales of Captain Underpants is an American animated television series produced by DreamWorks Animation Television. It is based on the film, Captain Underpants: The First Epic Movie, which is based on the Captain Underpants book series by Dav Pilkey. The series was released on Netflix on July 13, 2018.

Summary

Season 1 
The series revolves around the adventures of pranksters and comic book artists George Beard and Harold Hutchins, and their strict principal Mr. Krupp, who was hypnotized by George & Harold to become their creation: Captain Underpants, a brief-wearing superhero in a red cape and underpants.
Captain Underpants turns back into Krupp after getting hit with water at the end of almost every episode/adventure.

Season 2 
The second season involves Melvinborg, a cyborg 20 years from the future, who was disguised as Dr. Vil Endenemys, eventually taking over the school and replacing Mr. Krupp, so he can get Melvin, a child genius and George and Harold's enemy, into Eliteanati Academy. Melvinborg was also bullied by them

Season 3 
The third season involves George and Harold heading to a summer camp, with them having to deal with Mr. Krupp being the camp instructor and the eventful hijinx of the camp owned by the Federation of United National Camps (AKA the F.U.N.C.).

Episodes

Cast 
 Nat Faxon as Mr. Krupp/Captain Underpants
 Ramone Hamilton as George Beard
 Jay Gragnani as Harold Hutchins
 David Koechner as Mr. Meaner 
 Laraine Newman as Ms. Ribble 
 Patty Mattson as Ms. Anthrope
 Sean Astin as Narrator
 Peter Hastings as Comic Narrator
 Jorge Diaz as Melvin Sneedly, Mr. Rected, Melvinborg, and Stanley Peet
 Erica Luttrell as Erica Wang 
 Dayci Brookshire as Jessica Gordon and Dressy Killman
 Evan Kishiyama as Steve "Gooch" Yamaguchi 
 Brennan Murray as Bo Hweemuth   
 Trevor Devall as Smartsy Fartsy and new Smartsy Fartsy (who was eaten by Smartsy)
 Nolan North as Lee Dingman, Jet Wingman, and Dr. Shifty Fitzgibbons
 Secunda Wood as Moxie Swaggerman and Haily Comett
 Gavin C Robinson as Mr. Hand

Production
On December 12, 2017, Netflix and DreamWorks Animation Television announced that there would be an animated series to follow-up the film, entitled The Epic Tales of Captain Underpants. It premiered on the streaming service on July 13, 2018, and was executive-produced by Peter Hastings. A second season was announced and to be released on February 8, 2019. The third season was announced to be released on July 19, 2019. A new series, which contained six episodes, was announced to be released on July 10, 2020. 

In October 2019, Netflix released a 46-minute Halloween special of the series titled The Spooky Tale of Captain Underpants: Hack-a-Ween. In February 2020, an interactive special titled Captain Underpants: Epic Choice O' Rama was released. In December 2020, a 46-minute Christmas special titled Captain Underpants: Mega Blissmas was released.

Release
The series was first released on Netflix on July 13, 2018. The second season was released on February 8, 2019, and the third season was released on July 19, 2019. The series also aired in the UK on CITV.

References

External links
The Epic Tales of Captain Underpants at DreamWorks

2010s American animated television series
2020s American animated television series
2018 American television series debuts
2020 American television series endings
American children's animated action television series
American children's animated adventure television series
American children's animated comedy television series
American children's animated superhero television series
American flash animated television series
American television shows based on children's books
American television shows featuring puppetry
Animated television series about children
Animated television shows based on films
Captain Underpants
English-language Netflix original programming
Netflix children's programming
Television series based on adaptations
Television series based on books by Dav Pilkey
Television series by DreamWorks Animation
Television series by Universal Television
Television shows set in Ohio